Ranjit Kamble  is the former State Minister of Water Supply and Sanitation, Food and Civil Supplies, Consumer Protection, Tourism and Public Works (PWD) in the Government of Maharashtra in India. He is leader from the Indian National Congress Party. He is the nephew of Prabha Rau.

Political career

He was elected as member of Maharashtra Legislative Assembly from Deoli-Pulgaon, in Wardha district in October 2014. He was also MLA from Deoli-Pulgaon from 1999–2004, 2004–09, and 2009–14.

Held Positions
2013- Appointed Guardian Minister of Bhandara District

References

Marathi politicians
Living people
People from Wardha district
Maharashtra MLAs 2004–2009
Maharashtra MLAs 1999–2004
Maharashtra MLAs 2009–2014
Year of birth missing (living people)
Maharashtra MLAs 2019–2024
Indian National Congress politicians from Maharashtra